APL Photonics is a peer-reviewed open access scientific journal published by the American Institute of Physics. The editor-in-chief is Ben Eggleton (The University of Sydney Nano Institute). The journal covers fundamental and applied research on all aspects of photonics.

Abstracting and indexing
The journal is abstracted and indexed in the Science Citation Index Expanded. According to the Journal Citation Reports, the journal has a 2021 impact factor of 6.382.

References

External links
 

Publications established in 2016
English-language journals
American Institute of Physics academic journals
Open access journals
Photonics
Optics journals
Monthly journals